Majunu is a 2001 Indian Tamil-language romantic thriller film directed by Ravichandran and produced by Sunanda Murali Manohar. The film stars Prashanth and Rinke Khanna with Sonu Sood, Raghuvaran, Rati Agnihotri and Vivek appearing in other pivotal roles. The film's score and soundtrack were composed by Harris Jayaraj, whilst Priyan handled the cinematography. The film was distributed by London-based Tamil Television channel – Cee I TV. The film was released on 14 December 2001 and performed well at the box office. The movie was dubbed into Telugu with the same name. Notably, this was the first and only Tamil of yesteryear/erstwhile actress, Rinke Khanna.

Plot
Vasanth (Prashanth) is a post-graduate student and son of the wealthy MP Gajapathy (Raghuvaran). Gajapathy is a senior leader in a National religious and acts against inter-faith marriage. Vasanth lives a fun-filled life in Chennai, until he meets a girl (Rinke Khanna) when they both rush to save a baby who was about to fall in a railway track. He develops an attraction for that girl and again meets her in his college. He learns that her name is Heena, a Bengali girl whose father was a tamilian, and she has come for an exchange program. Meanwhile, terrorists plot to kill MP Gajapathy in an explosion at a public gathering. Heena, who was on an education trip to Chennai, searched for some books in a bookshop. Since a book was not available that day she has to return to the shop. While leaving the shop a sound comes from her watch alarm in her bag, which she jokes is a bomb that will destroy everything in 2 km radius. The shopkeeper laughs at her joke.

Heena returns to the shop, near where a public meeting is conducted. As planned by terrorists, a bomb explodes, but Gajapathy is only wounded. The shopkeeper immediately decides Heena is the terrorist because of the joke she made during her last visit. Also, the circumstantial evidence is against her. Hence, the police and Gajapathy's men search for her, but Heena escapes. Meanwhile, Vasanth hits one of the terrorists accidentally and finds bombs in his bags. He immediately chases the terrorist, but the terrorist kills himself using poison when the police catch him.

Heena hides in a house that turns out to be the palatial house of Vasanth. Vasanth finds her in the backyard and takes her to his room. Heena denies the charge against her. Vasanth assures her that he believes her and he has to send her back to Kolkata. Vasanth helps her by keeping her in his room without the knowledge of his parents. Both develop an attraction for each other, but Vasanth is keen on sending her home. Heena finds out that he is the son of the man whom she is charged for attempted murder. Vasanth takes her to the railway station in the midst of a cyclone rain and sends her to her home in Kolkata.

Vasanth lies to his parents that he is going for a vacation computer course and leaves for Kolkata along with his friend Ganesh, to find Heena knowing only her name. He searches for her in many colleges and finally finds her. She is happy to see Vasanth again and takes him to her home and introduces him to her mother (Rati Agnihotri) while her brother left before his arrival. It is revealed that her brother (Sonu Sood) is the mastermind in the plot to kill Gajapathy, which is not known by his family. He learns about the arrival of Vasanth and plans to kill him, without knowing he saved his sister. Both Vasanth and Heena become close which is disliked by her mother. She urges Heena to keep away from him which disappoints Heena. Vasanth expresses his love for her. Heena finds out the real identity of her brother and fears that he might kill Vasanth and so she pretends to reject him. Vasanth is hurt by her rejection but does not back off, hoping to win her love one day. Heena informs Gajapathy about all the incidents and makes him  come to Kolkata to take away his son. Gajapathy insists that Vasanth come with him and he unwillingly accepts. Heena's brother learns about Vasanth and Gajapathy and chases after them to kill them. Heena struggles to save them, but Vasanth does not co-operate with her as he wants her to accept him. Heena finally confesses her love and reveals that her behavior is because of her brother's true identity and intentions, which shatters Heena's mother. She unites both of them and asks them to leave the place. Both get into the running train in the nick of time before Heena's brother catches them. and he is arrested by police. The film ends with Vasanth and Heena united.

Cast

 Prashanth as Vasanth
 Rinke Khanna as Heena (Voice dubbed by Savitha Reddy)
 Raghuvaran as Gajapathy
 Vivek as Mano
 Sonu Sood as Heena's brother (Voice dubbed by Ravikiran)
 Rati Agnihotri as Heena's mother (Voice dubbed by Durga Sundarrajan)
 Vaiyapuri as Vasanth's friend
 S. N. Lakshmi as Vasanth's grandma
 Kavithalaya Krishnan
 Besant Ravi
 Nethra Raghuraman in a special appearance in the song "Mercury Mele"
 Anupama Verma in a special appearance in the song "Hari Gori"
 Nagendra Prasad in a special appearance in the song "Hari Gori"
 Ramji in a special appearance in the song "Mercury Mele"
 Thadi Balaji in a special appearance in the song "Mercury Mele"
 Sridhar in a special appearance in the song "Mercury Mele"

Production
Murali Manohar signed on actor Prashanth to appear in the fourth successive production for his studio, following the successes of their previous collaborations Jeans, Kaadhal Kavithai (1998) and Jodi (1999). Director Ravichandran, who had delivered a commercially successful film with Prashanth through Kannedhirey Thondrinal (1998), was chosen to direct Manohar's next production. Hindi actress Rinke Khanna was then signed on to make her Tamil film debut in October 2000 and joined the team after her mother Dimple Kapadia was impressed with the script. Actress Rati Agnihotri also signed on to play Rinke Khanna's mother in the film, making her first appearance in a Tamil film for twenty years. Models Nethra Raghuraman and Anupama Verma also made special appearances in the film.

The team shot scenes in North India, while Prashanth was injured during the making of the film, delaying it temporarily. The art director Yogamahi designed a lavish set in a studio for a song shooting costing Rs.10 lakh, with a Rajasthani ambiance created with 200 people working on it. The song Gulmohar Malare was shot in Colmar Tropicale,a French Themed village in Malaysia. The film had completed filming scenes by July 2001 and dubbing work began, preparing for a September release, although it was later postponed.

Release
The film opened in December 2001 to mixed reviews from critics, with Malathi Rangarajan of The Hindu noting "Majunu is a love story in a terrorist ambiance. The ambiance is undoubtedly different but surely the treatment could have been more gripping." Another critic wrote "The storyline is just stupid and should have never been. But Ravichandran makes a better director than a story-writer, and the movie is at least watchable." Another reviewer noted "The listless romance and the amateurish attempts at portraying terrorism here just prove that the same issues that were merged so effortlessly and effectively in Manirathnam's classic, Roja (1992), can also be combined to create a film that resides on the other end of the 'watchable' scale."

The film performed well commercially, releasing soon after a big-budget financial failure in Star for Prashanth.

Music
The music was composed by Harris Jayaraj, which was the first film he had signed to work on, though Minnale ended up releasing earlier. The audio cassette of the film was launched in a function held at Taj Coromandel Chennai, where Miss Universe 2000 pageant winner Lara Dutta was the event's chief guest. All lyrics were written by Vairamuthu and Thamarai, while the songs received positive reviews from film critics.

References

External links

Films shot in Kolkata
2001 films
2000s Tamil-language films
Films scored by Harris Jayaraj
Films about terrorism in India